The Tell-Tale Heart is a 2014 horror film directed by John La Tier, based on Edgar Allan Poe's 1843 short story of the same name.

Plot 
A man is haunted by the heart of a man he murdered. The film moves Poe's story into a contemporary New Orleans setting. Rose McGowan stars as a character who "may or may not be real".

Cast
 Rose McGowan as Ariel
 Patrick John Flueger as Sean
 Peter Bogdanovich as The Old Man
 Jacob Vargas as Adams
 Damon Whitaker as Charlie
 Tony Senzamici as Detective Travis
 Nick Jones Jr. as Military Police #2
 Scott Kodrik as Officer #3
 Evgeny Krutov as Lead Captor (Mark Krutov)
 Robin Hardy as The Apparition

Development
Filming began in October 2011 in New Orleans. The first image from the set was released on October 28, 2011. The first trailer for the film was released on May 10, 2013, and footage from the film was shown at Cannes. It was released in the U.S. in April, 2016, after nearly five years in production. The film was produced by the companies Popart Film Factory & Leverage Entertainment.

References

External links
 https://www.dreadcentral.com/news/66554/tell-tale-heart-keeps-beating-cannes

2014 films
American horror films
Films based on The Tell-Tale Heart
Films set in New Orleans
Films shot in New Orleans
2010s English-language films
2010s American films